John Miller (born March 10, 1968 in Toronto, Ontario) is a Canadian writer and consultant. He has published two novels to date, and his second novel won the Martin and Beatrice Fischer Award for Fiction from the Canadian Jewish Book Awards in 2008. In the same year, he also won an Honour of Distinction from the Dayne Ogilvie Grant, a Canadian award for openly lesbian, gay, bisexual or transgender writers.

In addition to his writing, Miller works as a policy development consultant for Canadian and international non-profit and government agencies, including several charities working around HIV/AIDS.

Novels
The Featherbed (2002)
A Sharp Intake of Breath (2007)
Wild and Beautiful Is the Night (2018)

References

External links
John Miller

1968 births
Canadian male novelists
Canadian consultants
Canadian gay writers
Writers from Toronto
Living people
Jewish Canadian writers
LGBT Jews
21st-century Canadian novelists
Canadian LGBT novelists
21st-century Canadian male writers
Gay novelists
21st-century Canadian LGBT people